Thorstein Helstad (born 28 April 1977) is a Norwegian former professional footballer who played as a forward.

Career

Helstad was born in Hamar, and started his career in his local club FL Fart where he at age 16 scored two goals against Løten in 1993 that made the team win promotion to 3. divisjon. He transferred to the local Norwegian First Division side HamKam, at the age of 18, and played for the club between 1995 and 1997. Helstad joined the Tippeligaen side Brann ahead of the 1998 season. He became one of the biggest stars in the team, and was Tippeliga top scorer in both 2000 and 2001 and won the Kniksen Award as the best striker in 2000. Helstad was sold to Austria Wien alongside Raymond Kvisvik, where he won both the Austrian Bundesliga, the Austrian Cup and the Austrian Supercup. After scoring 14 goals in 69 matches for the Austrian side, Helstad returned to Norway where he signed a four-year deal with Rosenborg.

With Steffen Iversen as the preferred striker, Helstad never managed to gain a regular spot in the first squad, but was often used a winger in a 4–3–3 system.

After scoring 24 goals in 58 matches, Helstad returned to Brann in June 2006. Since he transferred in the middle of the season he won both gold with Rosenborg and silver with Brann.

In July 2008, Brann accepted a €2 million bid for Helstad from French club Le Mans, where he was installed as their starting striker. Helstad scored 21 goals in 2010–11.

In June 2011, Helstad made a free transfer move to recently relegated and former Champions League finalist Monaco.

He announced his retirement from playing in April 2014.

Career statistics

Club

International goals
Scores and results list Norway's goal tally first, score column indicates score after each Helstad goal.

Honours
Austria Wien
Austrian Bundesliga: 2002–03
Austrian Cup: 2002–03
Austrian Supercup: 2003

Rosenborg
Tippeligaen: 2004, 2006

Brann
Tippeligaen: 2007

Individual
Tippeligaen top scorer: 2000, 2001, 2007
Kniksen Award Attacker of the Year: 2000, 2007
Norwegian Football Association Gold Watch

References

External links
Helstad profile at Norwegian FA 

1977 births
Living people
Sportspeople from Hamar
Norwegian footballers
Norway international footballers
Norway under-21 international footballers
FL Fart players
Hamarkameratene players
FK Austria Wien players
Rosenborg BK players
SK Brann players
Le Mans FC players
Lillestrøm SK players
Expatriate footballers in Austria
Expatriate footballers in France
Expatriate footballers in Monaco
Ligue 1 players
Ligue 2 players
Austrian Football Bundesliga players
Eliteserien players
Norwegian First Division players
Kniksen Award winners
Norwegian expatriate sportspeople in Austria
Norwegian expatriate sportspeople in France
Norwegian expatriate sportspeople in Monaco
Norwegian expatriate footballers
Association football forwards